Year of the monkey refers to the ninth year of the Chinese Zodiac.

As a title, it may also mean:
 Year of the Monkey (album), an album by Pushmonkey
 Year of the Monkey (book), a memoir by singer-songwriter Patti Smith